Ting On is one of the 40 constituencies in the Kwun Tong District of Hong Kong which was created in 1994 and currently held by nonpartisan Kam Kin.

The constituency loosely covers Kwun Tong Garden Estate and Lotus Tower in Ngau Tau Kok with the estimated population of 16,809.

Councillors represented

Election results

2010s

2000s

1990s

References

Constituencies of Hong Kong
Constituencies of Kwun Tong District Council
1991 establishments in Hong Kong
Constituencies established in 1991
Ngau Tau Kok